Henry Crawford Palmer (born September 14, 1970) is a French-American men's basketball player formerly with Strasbourg IG in France and the French men's national basketball team. Palmer, born in Ithaca, New York, attended Duke University from 1988 to 1991, then transferred to Dartmouth College. Palmer won a silver medal at the 2000 Summer Olympics playing for France.

References

1970 births
Living people
American expatriate basketball people in France
American expatriate basketball people in Spain
American men's basketball players
ASVEL Basket players
Basketball players at the 2000 Summer Olympics
Basketball players from New York (state)
Centers (basketball)
Dartmouth Big Green men's basketball players
Duke Blue Devils men's basketball players
French men's basketball players
French people of American descent
Joventut Badalona players
Liga ACB players
McDonald's High School All-Americans
Medalists at the 2000 Summer Olympics
Olympic basketball players of France
Olympic medalists in basketball
Olympic silver medalists for France
Parade High School All-Americans (boys' basketball)
Sportspeople from Ithaca, New York
SIG Basket players
Washington-Liberty High School alumni